Batocera lineolata is a species of beetle in the family Cerambycidae. It was described by Chevrolat in 1852. It is known from China, Korea, Japan and Taiwan.

Varietas
 Batocera lineolata var. flachi Schwarzer
 Batocera lineolata var. hauseri Schwarzer
 Batocera lineolata var. variecollis Schwarzer

References

Batocerini
Beetles described in 1852
Beetles of Asia